Arnold Damen (1815–1890) was a Dutch Jesuit missionary who is noted for bringing Jesuit education to Chicago.

Biography
Damen was born in Leur, North Brabant (The Netherlands) on March 20, 1815, and joined the Jesuit missions in North America under Pierre-Jean De Smet. He trained at St. Stanislaus Novitiate in Florissant, Missouri, and was ordained in 1844. His first job was teaching at St. Louis University, but in 1847 he was appointed pastor of the college church of St. Francis Xavier in St. Louis. In 1857 he was sent to establish the first Jesuit presence in Chicago, where he founded St. Ignatius College Prep, as well as the institution that would become Loyola University.

He died at Creighton College in Omaha, Nebraska, on January 1, 1890.

He is the namesake of Damen Avenue in Chicago.

References

1815 births
1890 deaths
19th-century Dutch Jesuits
Jesuit missionaries in the United States
Saint Louis University faculty
University and college founders
Presidents of Loyola University Chicago